John William White  FAIP FRACI is currently Professor of Physical and Theoretical Chemistry, Research School of Chemistry, at the Australian National University.

He is a past president, Royal Australian Chemical Institute and president of Australian Institute of Nuclear Science and Engineering. He has held the Argonne Fellowship (U. of Chicago) and was for many years a Fellow of St John's College, Oxford. Between 1975 and 1981 he was director of the Institut Laue-Langevin, Grenoble, France. He is a founder member of the International Society for Science and Religion

Research
White and his team have developed a simple method to produce a stable, thin (~90 Å) oil film on the surface of pure water, suitable for direct measurements of the oil-water interface using ellipsometry, X-ray or neutron reflectometry, or other experimental methods. Related research investigates nanoparticle interactions with protein. The public health implications of this research have also been evaluated.

Honours and awards
He has been awarded fellowships of the Royal Society of Chemistry (1982), the Royal Australian Chemical Institute (1986), the Australian Institute of Physics (1986), the Royal Society of London (1993) and the Australian Academy of Science (1991). He has received the H. G. Smith Medal (1997), the Craig Medal (2005), the Leighton Medal (2005) and the AONSA Prize (2015). 

He was awarded the Centenary Medal in 2001. and appointed an Officer of the Order of Australia in 2016.

References

Living people
Year of birth missing (living people)
Companions of the Order of St Michael and St George
Officers of the Order of Australia
Recipients of the Centenary Medal
Fellows of the Royal Society
Members of the International Society for Science and Religion
Fellows of the Australian Academy of Science
Fellows of St John's College, Oxford
Fellows of the Royal Society of Chemistry
Fellows of the Australian Institute of Physics
University of Sydney alumni
Alumni of the University of Oxford